Nicole Elizabeth Bolton is an Australian cricketer who plays as a left-handed batter and right-arm off break bowler for Australia and Sydney Sixers.

Early life and education
Bolton was born in Subiaco, an inner western suburb of Perth, where she was raised and has lived most of her life. Between 1993 and 2003, she went to school at Newman College, Perth, and from 2003 to 2006 she attended Methodist Ladies' College in the Perth suburb of Claremont.

As a young child, Bolton played cricket with her brothers in the back yard of the family home. However, she did not take up the game seriously until she was 15 years old, when she started playing for MLC in an organised competition. She also played at junior level for the Subiaco Marist Cricket Club.

From 2008 to 2011, Bolton studied for a Bachelor of Event, Sport and Recreation Management at Edith Cowan University. In 2016, she completed a Graduate Diploma in Teaching and Learning, Education, at Charles Darwin University.

Career
Bolton made her international debut on 23 January 2014, when she scored 124 runs off 152 balls. She joined Victoria in 2014 but returned to Western Australia in 2015.

In June 2015, she was named as one of Australia's touring party for the 2015 Women's Ashes in England, as a Test and ODI specialist who was not expected to play in the T20 internationals.

In April 2018, she was one of the fourteen players to be awarded a national contract for the 2018–19 season by Cricket Australia. In October 2018, she was named in Australia's squad for the 2018 ICC Women's World Twenty20 tournament in the West Indies.

In November 2018, she was named in the Perth Scorchers' squad for the 2018–19 Women's Big Bash League season. In April 2019, Cricket Australia awarded her with a contract ahead of the 2019–20 season. In June 2019, Cricket Australia named her in Australia's team for their tour to England to contest the Women's Ashes. She returned to the Australian squad, after taking a five-month break from the game dealing with a mental health issue. In October 2021, Bolton announced her retirement from playing state cricket. On 26 November 2022, she retired from all forms of cricket after playing in the Women's Big Bash League final.

One Day International centuries
On 23 January 2014, Bolton scored a century during her international debut, in a Women's Ashes multiple format series One Day International (ODI) match against England at the Melbourne Cricket Ground. She was the first Australian woman to score a century on ODI debut, and the first woman of any nationality to score such a century against a team fielded by a Full Member of the International Cricket Council (ICC).

Subsequently, Bolton scored three other ODI centuries, against three other Full Member teams, in three other countries. Her third ODI century was reached during Australia's opening match of the 2017 Women's Cricket World Cup; the other three were scored in bilateral series. Of all the women who have scored four or more ODI centuries, Bolton had the shortest career by number of ODIs, at just 50 matches between 2014 and 2019.

Personal life
Bolton's skills as a cook have been praised by her fellow international cricketer Harmanpreet Kaur as "pretty impressive". During Kaur's debut season with Lancashire Thunder in the Kia Super League, the two players shared an apartment. Kaur later told ESPNcricinfo:

See also 
 List of centuries in women's One Day International cricket

References

External links

Nicole Bolton at Cricket Australia

1989 births
Australia women One Day International cricketers
Australia women Test cricketers
Australia women Twenty20 International cricketers
Cricketers from Perth, Western Australia
Lancashire Thunder cricketers
Living people
Otago Sparks cricketers
Perth Scorchers (WBBL) cricketers
Sportswomen from Western Australia
Sydney Sixers (WBBL) cricketers
Victoria women cricketers
Western Australia women cricketers
Women cricketers who made a century on One Day International debut
Australian expatriate sportspeople in England